Five ships of the Royal Navy have borne the name HMS Sappho, after the Ancient Greek lyric poet Sappho. Two more were planned but one was cancelled and one received a different name before launching:

 was an 18-gun  launched in 1806 and broken up in 1830.
 was a 16-gun brig-sloop launched in 1837 that foundered in 1858.
HMS Sappho was to have been a wood screw sloop.  She was laid down in 1861 but was cancelled in 1863.
HMS Sappho was to have been a wood screw sloop, but she was renamed  in 1867 before being launched.
 was a composite screw sloop launched in 1873 and sold in 1887.
 was an  second class cruiser launched in 1891 and sold in 1921.
 was built in 1935 and destroyed by a German torpedo on 29 September, 1940. 

Royal Navy ship names